Harry “Dusty” Ellison (born 22 February 1993) is an English first-class cricketer. Ellison is a right-handed batsman and off spinner. He made his first-class debut for  Cambridge MCCU in 2014. Currently he is a specialist fielding coach for the KES 1st XI. Ellison's father, Richard Ellison, played for Kent and England.

References

1993 births
Living people
English cricketers
Hertfordshire cricketers
Place of birth missing (living people)
Cambridge MCCU cricketers